The Indiana Theatre is a multiple use performing arts venue located at 140 W. Washington Street in Indianapolis, Indiana. It was built as a movie palace and ballroom in 1927 and today is the home of the Indiana Repertory Theatre. It was added to the U.S. National Register of Historic Places in 1979.  It is located in the Washington Street-Monument Circle Historic District.

Description
The building is six stories and is of concrete frame construction. The front of the building is sheathed in white terra cotta. The main feature of the facade is the curving triangular arch with churrigueresque framing that fills the central bay above the marquee. The original marquee is still in place. The basement originally contained bowling alleys and billiard rooms. Upper floors were divided between office space and theater space. The interior included an entrance lobby, -story main lobby and a 3,200-seat auditorium. The auditorium was distinguished by elaborate plaster ornamentation based on Spanish Baroque motifs. The building is topped by the Indiana Roof Ballroom, a large atmospheric ballroom decorated to resemble a square surrounded by buildings with a stage at one end. The ballroom has an elliptical dome with sky effects. The theater is a major example of the American motion picture palace. The building was restored and the auditorium was extensively remodeled in 1979–80 to accommodate the needs of the Indiana Repertory Theatre.

References

Further reading
 Historic American Buildings Survey in Indiana, edited by Thomas M. Slade, page 43

External links

 
 Information about Building - http://www.emporis.com/en/wm/bu/?id=indianarepertorystreetatre-indianapolis-in-usa
Indiana Theatre from Indianapolis, a National Park Service Discover Our Shared Heritage Travel Itinerary

Movie palaces
Cinemas and movie theaters in Indiana
Historic American Buildings Survey in Indiana
Individually listed contributing properties to historic districts on the National Register in Indiana
Theatres on the National Register of Historic Places in Indiana
Event venues established in 1927
Buildings and structures in Indianapolis
National Register of Historic Places in Indianapolis
1927 establishments in Indiana